Gentiobiose is a disaccharide composed of two units of D-glucose joined with a β(1->6) linkage.  It is a white crystalline solid that is soluble in water or hot methanol.  Gentiobiose is incorporated into the chemical structure of crocin, the chemical compound that gives saffron its color. It is a product of the caramelization of glucose. During a starch hydrolysis process for glucose syrup, gentiobiose, which has bitterness, is formed as an undesirable product through the acid-catalyzed condensation reaction of two D-glucose molecules. One β-D-glucose unit elongation of the bitter disaccharide reduces its bitterness by a fifth, as determined by human volunteers using the trimer, gentiotriose.  Gentiobiose is also produced via enzymatic hydrolysis of glucans, including pustulan and β-1,3-1,6-glucan.

References

Disaccharides